Monajatuddin (18 January 1945 – 29 December 1995) was a Bangladeshi investigative journalist. He was awarded Ekushey Padak in 1997, by the Government of Bangladesh. In 1995, while investigating two boat capsizing events, he accidentally fell into the water from a ferry on the Padma River and died.

Early life and education

Monajatuddin was born in 1945, to Alimuddin and Motijannesa. He passed matriculation from Rangpur Kolashranjon School and Intermediate Examination from Rangpur Carmichael College.

Career
Monajatuddin started his career with the Bogra Bulletin in the 1960s. He then worked for a short while with Dainik Purbadesh and Dainik Azad. He then worked for almost 20 years as a regional correspondent in Dainik Sangbad.

Works 
 Shah Alam o Maziborer Kahini (1975)
 Path theke Pathe (1991)
 Kansonar Mukh o Sangbad Nepathye (1992)
 Pairaband Shekor Sangbad (1993)

Awards 
 Zahur Hosen Gold Medal (1984)
 Philips Award (1993)
 Ekushey Padak (1997)

References 

1945 births
1995 deaths
Bangladeshi journalists
Recipients of the Ekushey Padak
Deaths by drowning
People from Rangpur District
20th-century journalists